The 1996 Barber Dodge Pro Series season was the eleventh season of the series. All drivers used Dodge powered Goodyear shod Mondiale chassis. Derek Hill and Tony Renna were named co-Rookies of the Year and were awarded a paid half-season of the 1997 Barber Dodge Pro Series.

Race calendar and results

Final standings

References

Barber Dodge Pro Series
1996 in American motorsport